Bergens Privatbank was a Norwegian commercial bank based in Bergen. It was established in 1855 and built a network of branches throughout the country. Jørgen Breder Faye was the first director and held the position until 1904. The bank merged with Bergens Kreditbank in 1975 to establish Bergen Bank.

References

Defunct banks of Norway
Companies based in Bergen
1975 disestablishments in Norway
Banks established in 1855
Banks disestablished in 1975
Norwegian companies established in 1855